Joseph Edward Barbara (born December 5, 1967) is an American television and soap opera actor.

Early life
Barbara was born on December 5, 1967 in New Smyrna Beach, Florida. He has a B.S. in television and film production from Syracuse University. After leaving college, he worked briefly as a production assistant at Entertainment Tonight.

Career
Barbara is currently starring in the first national tour A Bronx Tale - The Musical, written by Chazz Palminteri and directed by Robert De Niro and Jerry Zaks. 
He is best known for his role on Another World as Joseph Carlino (from 1995 to 1999). He then appeared on All My Children in 2000 as Paolo Caselli. He also appeared on Broadway in the revival of the musical Grease (as Danny Zuko) and off-Broadway in Tony and Tina's Wedding (as 'Dominick Fabrizi'). He is currently performing the role of mob boss Gyp DeCarlo in the Las Vegas production of Jersey Boys. He was also the voice of Ray Boccino in Grand Theft Auto IV.

Filmography

Film

Television

Video games

Personal life
He revealed in TV Guide that he was an only child and had been an altar boy.

He’s married to former WFMJ-TV 21 Morning News Anchor Nicole Perry (since July 15, 2000) and they have a son, Joseph Frederick Barbara (born March 4, 2003).

References

External links
 
 

1967 births
Male actors from Florida
American male soap opera actors
American male television actors
Living people
People from New Smyrna Beach, Florida